The Overlapping distribution method was introduced by Charles H. Bennett for estimating chemical potential.

Theory 

from 

get the thermodynamic free energy difference is 

For every configuration visited during this sampling of system 1 we can compute the potential energy U as a function of the configuration space, and the potential energy difference is 

Now construct a probability density of the potential energy from the above equation:

 

since 

now define two functions:

thus that 

and can be obtained by fitting  and

References 

Potentials
Chemical thermodynamics